Aegon Life Insurance Company (formerly known as Aegon Religare Life Insurance Company) is an Indian life insurance company, founded in 2008 with headquarters in Mumbai, India, offering individual and group insurance online and offline.

It is a joint venture between Dutch Aegon N.V., a multinational insurance, pensions and asset management company, and The Times Group (also called Bennett Coleman & Co. Ltd), one of India’s largest media conglomerates.

Corporate history 
In July 2006, AEGON and the Ranbaxy Group announced its intention to enter the insurance business in India. The partnership of AEGON, Religare & Bennett, Coleman & Company formed AEGON Religare Life Insurance Company Limited and launched in July 2008.

In 2015, Aegon increased its stake in the venture to 49% while Religare Enterprises announced it was exiting the venture by selling its entire shareholding in the company, 44%, to Bennett, Coleman and Company, the holding company of the Times Group. This led to the rebranding from Aegon Religare Life Insurance Company to Aegon Life Insurance Company.

In September 2019, it partnered with Paytm to offer comprehensive insurance products. In March 2020, the company entered into partnership with Flipkart to sell paperless life insurance policies on their platform.

Products and services 
Aegon Life Insurance's distribution channels include banks, individual agents, brokers, and corporate agents, bancassurance partners, among others. The company offers term insurance plans, savings and investment plans, child plans, and unit-linked insurance plans (ULIPs). In May 2018, the company launched the '' plan, which offers insurance cover up to 100 years. It launched a new version of its '' Insurance Plan in November 2019 that provides regular monthly income after the age of 60.

Recognition 
 In 2019, Aegon Life Insurance was awarded as eBusiness Leader – Medium & Small at World BFSI Award by World BFSI Congress. 
 Aegon Religare Life Insurance awarded as E-Business Leader by Indian Insurance Award in 2013.

See also 
 List of insurance companies in India

References

External links 
 Official website

Financial services companies based in Mumbai
Life insurance companies of India
Indian companies established in 2008
2008 establishments in Maharashtra